The Conway Brothers were an American vocal and instrumental group from Chicago, Illinois, made up of brothers Frederick (keyboards), Hiawatha (drums), Huston (bass), and James (guitar). They are best known for their single "Turn It Up", which reached No. 11 on the UK Singles Chart in 1985.

Discography

Albums
 Turn It Up! (1985)
 Lady in Red (1987)

Compilations
 Dance Club Hits Vol. 1 (1996)

Singles

References

External links
 The Conway Brothers at Discogs.

Musical groups from Chicago
American rhythm and blues musical groups
American electronic music groups